Charles Hermite (1822–1901) was a French mathematician.

Hermite or Hermitte may also refer to:

Hermite
 Hermite (crater), a lunar impact crater located in 1964, named after Charles Hermite
 Hermite constant, in mathematics
 Hermite distribution, in probability theory and statistics
 Hermite interpolation, in numerical analysis
 Hermite normal form, in linear algebra
 Hermite polynomials, a classical orthogonal polynomial sequence
 Hermite spline, a spline curve where each polynomial of the spline is in Hermite form
 Hermite Islands, a group of Chilean islands named after the Dutch admiral Jacques l'Hermite
 Hermite, the biggest island of the Hermite Islands archipelago

Hermitte
 Achille-Antoine Hermitte (born 1840), French architect 
 Enrique Hermitte (1871-1955), Argentine geologist
 Esther Hermitte (1921-1990), Argentine social anthropologist

See also
 Hermit (disambiguation)
 L'Hermite (disambiguation)
 Hermitian matrix